Sir William Duthie (1892–1980) was a British politician.

William Duthie may also refer to:

William Duthie (author) (1852–1870), English author and poet, friend of Dickens
William Duthie (shipbuilder) (1824–1896), Scottish sea captain and shipbuilder

See also 
William Duthie Morgan